The pale cicadabird (Edolisoma ceramense) is a species of bird in the family Campephagidae. It is endemic to the Maluku Islands of Indonesia. Its natural habitats are subtropical or tropical moist lowland forest and subtropical or tropical moist montane forest.

References

pale cicadabird
Birds of the Maluku Islands
pale cicadabird
pale cicadabird
Taxonomy articles created by Polbot